John John Jesse (born 1969) is an illustrative painter from New York City's Lower East Side in the Juxtapoz gonzo-pop vein. He often shows with artists like Esao Andrews. Jesse has cited Gustav Klimt, Caravaggio, Béla Iványi-Grünwald, and Mark Ryden as influences

He painted the girls he grew up with, citing the punk lifestyle of girls and drugs. Most of the people featured in his work are friends of his. They are generally nude or partially disrobed, in situations that are both fantastical and gritty. Jesse has, to date, two self declared series of renderings. The first consisting of black & white drawings he calls the "Baby Demonica" series and the second, full color paintings he calls the "Demonica Erotica" series. His paintings have been exhibited and sold at Art @ Large, a New York City erotic art gallery.

Jesse was a founding member and bassist of the New York Crust punk band, Nausea. The band toured the U.S., Canada, and Europe and disbanded in 1992. He has designed posters and album art for bands like Agnostic Front. He is a former guitar player for the band Morning Glory.

In 2005, Vivian Giourousis interviewed the artist for Hoard magazine and asked him to define punk rock. He replied, "…punk rock was the world in which I entered at 14 years old because I didn't fit in anywhere, not at school, not with friends, and not with my family. Back in the 80's we were all serious misfits who didn't belong, and together we were REALLY united. We all came from broken homes, we were victims of child abuse, we were angry, political, idealistic, drunk and proud. Basically punk rock music goes beyond the realms of just being a music scene. It's a lifestyle and commitment. It's my world, and honestly it's all I know and it's where I fit."

References

External links 
 
 John John Jesse's art from Sept 9, 2004 Art@Large Gallery Show in New York City
 Juxtapoz Print Announcement
 "Transgression" show at Last Rites Gallery Saturday, 29 March 2008 
 "Rome Is Burning/The New School" show
  interview 

20th-century American painters
American male painters
21st-century American painters
21st-century American male artists
1969 births
Living people
Nausea (band) members
20th-century American male artists